Rafiqul Anwar (died 25 October 2012) was a Bangladesh Awami League politician and served as a Jatiya Sangsad member representing the Chittagong-4 constituency.

Career
Anwar was elected to parliament from Chittagong-4 as a Bangladesh Awami League candidate in 1996 and 2001. He served as the Vice-President of Chittagong District unit of Bangladesh Awami League. He was the Chairman of Chittagong Abahani.

Death
Anwar died on 25 October 2012 in Square Hospital, Dhaka, Bangladesh.

References

2012 deaths
Awami League politicians
7th Jatiya Sangsad members
8th Jatiya Sangsad members
Year of birth missing
Place of birth missing